The men's 100 metre breaststroke competition at the 2014 Pan Pacific Swimming Championships took place on 22 August at the Gold Coast Aquatic Centre, Queensland, Australia.  The last champion was Kosuke Kitajima of Japan.

This race consisted of two lengths of the pool, both lengths being in breaststroke.

Records
Prior to this competition, the existing world and Pan Pacific records were as follows:

Results
All times are in minutes and seconds.

Heats
The first round was held on 22 August, at 10:20.

B Final 
The B final was held on 22 August, at 19:54.

A Final 
The A final was held on 22 August, at 19:54.

References

2014 Pan Pacific Swimming Championships